Paul McCabe (born 4 August 1959 in Toowoomba, Queensland) is an Australian former rugby league footballer who played in the 1970s and 1980s.  He played for several clubs as well as representing Queensland in State of Origin series. McCabe was also a member of the 1982 "Invincibles" Kangaroos side, playing in the third Test against Great Britain. His older brother John was also a Queensland representative player in the 1970s who played for the Valley's in the BRL.

Playing career
In 1981, McCabe was selected to play for both New South Wales and Queensland. He played the first two games of the series for the Blues and the third game, selected on state of origin rules, for the Maroons. He is one of the few Queensland origin players to have previously played for the Blues.

McCabe played for North Sydney, Eastern Suburbs, Manly-Warringah and Balmain before returning to Queensland. He is one of six players to ever represent NSW and QLD in the same origin series, He also represented Sydney City Firsts and Brisbane, McCabe also played origin in 1983 and 1985, but wasn't able to play in 1984 due to injury.

Personal life
He now is a father of 3, Jacob McCabe (born 1991), Jessica McCabe (born 1992), and Emily McCabe (born 1995).

References

External links
Paul McCabe at stateoforigin.com.au
Paul McCabe at the Rugby League Project
Queensland representatives at qrl.com.au

 

1959 births
Living people
Australia national rugby league team players
Australian rugby league players
Balmain Tigers players
City New South Wales rugby league team players
Manly Warringah Sea Eagles players
New South Wales Rugby League State of Origin players
North Sydney Bears players
Norths Devils players
People educated at Padua College (Brisbane)
Queensland Rugby League State of Origin players
Rugby league players from Toowoomba
Rugby league second-rows
Sydney Roosters players